The Waverly, Tennessee, tank car explosion occurred at approximately 2:58 pm on February 24, 1978, in Waverly, Tennessee, following a train derailment incident days earlier. A tank car containing  of liquefied petroleum gas (LPG) exploded as a result of cleanup related to the derailment.

Derailment
At about 10:30 p.m. on February 22, twenty-four cars of a 92-car Louisville and Nashville Railroad (L&N) freight train derailed in the downtown area of Waverly. Initially, local emergency services handled the accident, including inspecting the wreck for signs of any hazardous material (or hazmat) leaks. The responding team assumed the LPG tank car was a double-wall tank car; however, it was a single-wall car.

Response to derailment
At 5:10 a.m. on February 23, after a previous miscommunication regarding hazardous material being present, the Tennessee Office of Civil Defense (TOCD, a precursor to the Tennessee Emergency Management Agency or TEMA) sent out a hazmat team to assess the situation. They concurred with the local officials' decision to keep the tank cars cool by spraying them with streams of water, and the decision was made to evacuate a  area around the derailment zone, with gas and electric service to the area shut off.

By this time, Louisville and Nashville wreck crews were beginning to clear debris. The tank car that would eventually explode, owned by Union Tank Car Company and numbered UTLX 83013, was buried by debris. Crews removed the wrecked cars and UTLX 83013 was moved to clear the tracks, and the rail line partially reopened at about 8 p.m. on February 23. A tanker truck and a crew specializing in LPG cleanup arrived about 1 p.m. on February 24.

Tank car explodes

About 20 minutes before the LPG removal was to begin, the area was tested with dedicated gas detection equipment and no leaks were found. The Waverly police and fire chiefs were on the scene and the hazmat crew was moving its equipment to start the transfer when at 2:58 p.m. vapor was discovered leaking from the tank car. Before any action could be taken, a boiling liquid expanding vapor explosion (BLEVE) occurred.

The blast was felt for hundreds of feet and seen for miles, and disabled most of the fire-fighting equipment at the site. The explosion started numerous fires in nearby buildings and torched a number of road vehicles and other rail cars.

Response to explosion
Over the next several hours over 250 emergency vehicles converged on the blast site, some from as far as Nashville and Memphis. Air ambulances from Fort Campbell Army Post were dispatched to the site and the worst burn victims were moved to Nashville for initial treatment. A number of these were then transported to burn centers in Louisville, Kentucky, Birmingham, Alabama and Cincinnati, Ohio late on February 25.

By 7:00 pm the fires were under control, and a search for additional casualties began. It was later terminated because of visibility problems, but resumed at 5:30 am. on February 25. A car loaded with paper products reignited circa 3:15 pm, but was quickly extinguished. A second LPG car was emptied by 10:30 pm. Local residents were allowed to return home at 8:30 a.m. on February 26.

Aftermath
A total of sixteen people died as a result of the blast and the aftermath; six were killed instantly. Among those lost were Waverly's fire chief Wilbur York and police chief Guy Barnett, TOCD state investigator Mark Belyew, members of the L&N wreck crew, and several residents of the area. 43 others were injured to various degrees.

Sixteen structures in Waverly were destroyed, and another 20 seriously damaged. Both of Waverly's fire trucks were destroyed. In 1979, the total property damage was estimated at $1,800,000, .

The National Transportation Safety Board (NTSB) eventually blamed the blast on the car itself, as a crack had developed when the car was damaged by the derailment. It is believed that this crack expanded when the car was moved off the tracks, eventually causing overpressurization in the tank, causing the single wall to fail. The NTSB commended the town of Waverly on its preparedness for such an emergency, but also exposed the need for all people involved in accident cleanups to be trained in how to handle hazardous materials.

The Waverly explosion, along with other accidents involving railroad derailments and hazardous materials (the most infamous being the train derailment in Mississauga, Ontario, Canada on November 10, 1979) resulted in a major rework of how authorities deal with such emergencies. Tennessee and the TOCD created a set of standards and the Tennessee Hazardous Materials Institute in 1980 for the training of hazmat responders, and since the institute's formation, there have been no fatalities of Tennessee emergency responders at hazmat sites.

It was also one of the events that a National Governors Association study says helped push the establishment of the Federal Emergency Management Agency (FEMA), created by President Jimmy Carter's executive order in 1979.

See also
Memphis tanker truck disaster

References

External links
Tennessee Emergency Management Agency

1978 in Tennessee
Explosions in 1978
Industrial fires and explosions in the United States
Railway accidents in 1978
Railway accidents and incidents in Tennessee
Humphreys County, Tennessee
Accidents and incidents involving Louisville and Nashville Railroad
Derailments in the United States
February 1978 events in the United States
1978 disasters in the United States
Fires in Tennessee